Wicked is a Zierer steel launched roller coaster located at Lagoon Amusement Park in Farmington, Utah, United States. Designed by Werner Stengel, the ride was manufactured by Zierer at a cost of $10 million and opened to the public in 2007.

History

Construction of the attraction began in August 2006. Wicked was designed by Werner Stengel and manufactured by Zierer, with fabrication subcontracted to Stakotra Manufacturing. The total cost to construct the ride was $10 million, and it opened to the public on June 1, 2007. The ride has been described as "very smooth and lacks any jerking or shaking" by Deseret News, which also noted that riders were secured unusually by their ankles and thighs instead of the traditional shoulder and lap restraints.

Wicked is located in the south midway of the park in an area previously used for parking. It has a green track with mostly silver supports, the only exception being the bright yellow supports of the launch tower.

Ride experience
The train leaves the station and turns into a dark tunnel. The launch is in two parts, with a short boost launch inside the tunnel and a longer, vertical launch straight up the top hat element. This is followed by a small airtime hill with a trim brake and a whip around an Immelmann turn. The track levels out before sending riders up into a zero-g roll, followed by a short descent into a shallow turn. The train descends into a double half-pipe, twists right then left, and proceeds into a downward helix that twists back to the left. The train dips into a tunnel-covered trench before lifting and leveling out into the final brake run. Every so often, the LSM will launch a car up the tower but the car will fail to make it over the apex of the tower. At this time the emergency brakes will deploy and the car will enter a slowed descent back into the launch tunnel. The ride was engineered for this to happen so the employees will reset the system and launch the car again at a greater speed ensuring that the car will make it over the crest of the hill.

References

External links

Roller coasters introduced in 2007
Lagoon (amusement park)
Roller coasters in Utah
2007 establishments in Utah